Madonna and Child with Saints is a 1588 oil on canvas painting by Annibale Carracci, now in the Gemäldegalerie Alte Meister in Dresden. Signed and dated by the artist (HANNIBAL CARRACTIVS BON. F. MDLXXXVIII), it is also known as Madonna and Child with Saints Francis, Matthew and John the Baptist, Madonna and Child Enthroned with Saint Matthew and the St Matthew Madonna.

It was originally produced as an altarpiece for the merchants' chapel in the basilica of San Prospero in Reggio Emilia, one of several works the artist produced whilst in the city in the 1580s and 1590s. It then entered the Este collections in Modena, from which it was sold in 1746 as part of the Dresden sale to Augustus III, taking it to its present home.

The work shows a stronger Venetian influence than any of the artist's earlier works and its precise dating allows art historians to date his study trip to Venice to 1587-1588. One clear influence on its composition is Paolo Veronese's Mystic Marriage of Saint Catherine, from which it borrows its diagonals, the position of the Madonna and saints and the red drape hanging from columns. Carracci did not entirely reject his previous style, however, and so these lessons from Veronese are translated into a less otherworldly idiom, closer to the viewer's lived experience - Carracci opts for a glimpse of a landscape background rather than the celestial blue of so many of Veronese's works and the saints humbly clothed and standing on bare earth rather than the richly-dressed figures on stairs in Veronese's work.

Gallery

References

1588 paintings
Paintings by Annibale Carracci
Paintings of the Madonna and Child
Paintings of Francis of Assisi
Paintings depicting Matthew the Apostle
Collections of the Gemäldegalerie Alte Meister
Este collection